Mueang Udon Thani) is the capital district (amphoe mueang) of Udon Thani province, northeastern Thailand.

Geography
Neighboring districts are (from the north clockwise): Phen, Phibun Rak, Nong Han, Prachaksinlapakhom, Kumphawapi, Nong Saeng, Nong Wua So, Kut Chap, and Ban Phue of Udon Thani Province.

History
Originally named Ban Mak Khaeng (บ้านหมากแข้ง), the district was one of the original four districts of Udon Thani established during the thesaphiban administrative reforms in 1908. In 1938 its name was changed from Mak Khaeng to Mueang Udon Thani.

Ramasun Station
Ramasun Station, formerly Chang ('elephant') Station, officially the 7th Radio Research Field Station (RRFS), in Non Sung Subdistrict, was constructed by the US in 1964, just as the Vietnam War was gaining momentum. The site was run by the Army Security Agency (ASA) the Army's signals intelligence branch closely allied with the National Security Agency. Its purpose was radio communications intercept and triangulation of enemy installations. The site was dominated by a large, circular Wullenweber array. In its heyday, the station housed 1,200–1,500 US personnel, complete with sleeping quarters, a cinema, a post exchange (PX), gym, swimming pool, tennis court, arms depot, and a 300 m long tunnel that the Thai army today claims was used for electronic cable storage. It employed more than 1,400 Thais at generous wages. With the US pullout of Southeast Asia in 1975, the station was handed over to the Thai 3rd Infantry Division. In 1983, it became the base of the 1st Battalion, 13th Infantry Regiment. In August 1997, it was renamed "Sunthondhammathada Camp". The station reemerged in news of the US War on Terror as some believe it to be the location of a US CIA "black site" used to interrogate suspected terrorists by the United States.

Administration
The district is divided into 21 sub-districts (tambons), which are further subdivided into 248 villages (mubans). The city (thesaban nakhon) Udon Thani covers tambon Mak Khaeng and parts of Nong Bua and Nong Khon Kwang. There are two town municipalities (thesaban mueang). Nong Samrong covers tambon Na Di and parts of Mu Mon, Ban Lueam, and Non Sung. Nam Kham covers parts of tambon Non Sung. There are five sub-district municipalities (thesaban tambon). Nikhom Songkhro covers parts of tambon Nikhom Songkhro and Khok Sa-at; Nong Bua parts of tambon Nong Bua, Nong Na Kham, Sam Phrao, and Nong Khon Kwang; Ban Chan parts of tambon Ban Chan and Nong Khon Kwang; Na Kha parts of tambon Na Kha. There are 18 tambon administrative organizations (TAO).

Economy
Non Sung, Nong Phai, and Nong Khon Kwang Sub-districts of Mueang Udon Thani District will become sites of the Udon North potash mine if the project is approved.

References

External links
amphoe.com (Thai)

Mueang Udon Thani